The Harmsworth Cup, popularly known as the Harmsworth Trophy, is a historically important British international trophy for motorboats.

History

The Harmsworth was the first annual international award for motorboat racing. Officially, it is a contest not between boats or individuals but between nations. The boats were originally to be designed and built entirely by residents of the country represented, using materials and units built wholly within that country. The rules were somewhat relaxed in 1949 and may have been relaxed further since.

It was founded by the newspaper publisher Alfred Charles William Harmsworth (later Lord Northcliffe) in 1903.

In 1903, the course was from Cobh (Queenstown) to the marina in Cork, Ireland. It was a poorly organised affair, with many boats failing even to start due to the British organisers claiming the French boats were not completely built in France, and thus they were excluded from the race. Thus there were three entries, but the organisers insisted in running heats before the final race. Mr F Beadel was excluded from competing in the final despite putting in a better time over the -mile course than Thornycroft England won the trophy in 1903 with Dorothy Levitt driving a Napier-powered, 40-foot steel-hulled boat at 19.53 mph at Queenstown in Cork harbour. It was owned and entered by Selwyn Edge a director of Napier Motors. France won in 1904. In 1907, it was won by Americans for the first time. The US and England traded it back and forth until 1920. From 1920 to 1933, Americans had an unbroken winning streak. Gar Wood won this race eight times as a driver and nine times as an owner between 1920 and 1933.

Time magazine said of the 1920 race: "Many a race between shadowy contraband-carrying rumrunners and swift, searchlight playing patrol boats has been run on the narrow Detroit river. Last week 400,000 persons lined the river's edge to watch millionaires race millionaires."

The Harmsworth was reinstated in 1949 and remained in American hands until 1959. In 1959, Canadians won the award. The driver, Bob Hayward, won the Harmsworth again in 1960 and 1961. He died in another race in 1961. The Harmsworth was not run again until 1977, and continued to be run until 1986.

In 1989 it was awarded to Stefano Casiraghi, husband of Princess Caroline of Monaco.

The trophy has been awarded sporadically from 1986 through to 2018, with a total of eleven earned in that time.

Trophy winners

See also
 Henry Segrave
 Hubert Scott-Paine
 Betty Carstairs

References

External links
 The iconic Harmsworth Trophy will be awarded in 2018
 2018 Rules
 The British International Harmsworth Trophy-Triumphs
 The Trustees, British International Harmsworth Trophy
 The Speed Boat Kings at Channel4.com
 The Harmsworth Trophy to be competed for in 2011
 "Racing Boat Like Flying Fish Triumphs For England", Popular Mechanics, November 1930, photo and story of Miss Britain I

Motorboat races
Recurring events established in 1903
1903 establishments in Europe